Sven Arvor (26 July 1907 - 16 November 2001) was a Swedish actor best known for his roles in Fröken Julie, Kungliga Johansson and Kvinna utan ansikte.

Filmography
1934 – Kungliga Johansson
1936 – Johan Ulfstjerna
1936 – Janssons frestelse
1936 – The Lady Becomes a Maid 
1936 – Kungen kommer
1937 – Familjen Andersson
1937 – Klart till drabbning
1939 – Filmen om Emelie Högqvist
1940 – Stål
1942 – Sexlingar
1943 – Livet på landet
1944 – Prins Gustaf
1944 – Excellensen
1944 – Klockan på Rönneberga
1944 – Räkna de lyckliga stunderna blott
1945 – His Majesty Must Wait
1946 – Johansson och Vestman
1947 – Stackars lilla Sven
1947 – Kvinna utan ansikte
1947 – Jens Månsson i Amerika
1948 – Banketten
1948 – Flottans kavaljerer
1949 – Kärleken segrar
1949 – Kvinnan som försvann
1950 – Frökens första barn
1951 – Fröken Julie
1955 – The Magnificent Lie 
1957 – A Guest in His Own House 
1957 – Mother Takes a Vacation

References

1907 births
2001 deaths
Swedish male film actors
20th-century Swedish male actors
Place of death missing